SIF Stadion is a sports venue located in Stavanger, Norway. It is the home ground of Stavanger IF Fotball.

Football venues in Norway
Sports venues in Stavanger